Raymond Georges Yves Tanguy (January 5, 1900 – January 15, 1955), known as just Yves Tanguy, was a French surrealist painter.

Biography

Tanguy, the son of a retired navy captain, was born January 5, 1900, at the Ministry of Naval Affairs on Place de la Concorde in Paris, France. His parents were both of Breton origin. After his father's death in 1908, his mother moved back to her native Locronan, Finistère, and he ended up spending much of his youth living with various relatives.

In 1918, Tanguy briefly joined the merchant navy before being drafted into the Army, where he befriended Jacques Prévert. At the end of his military service in 1922, he returned to Paris, where he worked various odd jobs. He stumbled upon a painting by Giorgio de Chirico and was so deeply impressed he resolved to become a painter himself in spite of his complete lack of formal training.

Tanguy had a habit of being completely absorbed by the current painting he was working on. This way of creating artwork may have been due to his very small studio which only had enough room for one wet piece.

Through his friend Prévert, in around 1924 Tanguy was introduced into the circle of surrealist artists around André Breton. Tanguy quickly began to develop his own unique painting style, giving his first solo exhibition in Paris in 1927, and marrying his first wife Jeannette Ducrocq (1896–1977) later that same year. During this busy time of his life, Breton gave Tanguy a contract to paint 12 pieces a year. With his fixed income, he painted less and ended up creating only eight works of art for Breton.

In December 1930, at an early screening of Buñuel and Dalí's L'Age d'Or, right-wing activists went to the lobby of the cinema where the film was being screened, and destroyed art works by Dalí, Joan Miró, Man Ray, Tanguy, and others.

Throughout the 1930s, Tanguy adopted the bohemian lifestyle of the struggling artist with gusto, leading eventually to the failure of his first marriage. He had an intense affair with Peggy Guggenheim in 1938 when he went to London with his wife Jeannette Ducrocq to hang his first retrospective exhibition in Britain at her gallery Guggenheim Jeune. The exhibition was a great success and Guggenheim wrote in her autobiography that "Tanguy found himself rich for the first time in his life". She purchased his pictures Toilette de L'Air and The Sun in Its Jewel Case (Le Soleil dans son écrin) for her collection. Tanguy also painted Peggy two beautiful earrings.  The affair continued in both London and Paris and only finished when Tanguy met a fellow Surrealist artist who would become his second wife.

In 1938, after seeing the work of fellow artist Kay Sage, Tanguy began a relationship which led to his second marriage. With the outbreak of World War II, Sage moved back to her native New York, and Tanguy, judged unfit for military service, followed her. He would spend the rest of his life in the United States. Sage and Tanguy were married in Reno, Nevada on August 17, 1940. Their marriage proved durable but tense. Both drank heavily, and Tanguy assaulted Sage verbally and sometimes physically, pushing her and sometimes even threatening her with a knife privately and at social gatherings. Sage, according to friends' accounts, made no response to her husband's aggression. Toward the end of the war, the couple moved to Woodbury, Connecticut, converting an old farmhouse into an artists' studio. They spent the rest of their lives there. In 1948, he became a naturalized citizen of the United States.

In January 1955, Tanguy suffered a fatal stroke at Woodbury. His body was cremated and his ashes preserved until Sage's death in 1963. Later, his ashes were scattered by his friend Pierre Matisse on the beach at Douarnenez in his beloved Brittany, together with those of his wife.

Style and legacy 
Tanguy's paintings have a unique, immediately recognizable style of nonrepresentational surrealism. They show vast, abstract landscapes, mostly in a tightly limited palette of colors, only occasionally showing flashes of contrasting color accents. Typically, these alien landscapes are populated with various abstract shapes, sometimes angular and sharp as shards of glass, sometimes with an intriguingly organic look to them, like giant amoebae suddenly turned to stone.

According to Nathalia Brodskaïa, Mama, Papa is Wounded! (1927) is one of Tanguy's most impressive paintings. Brodskaïa writes that the painting reflects his debt to Giorgio de Chirico – falling shadows and a classical torso – and conjures up a sense of doom: the horizon, the emptiness of the plain, the solitary plant, the smoke, the helplessness of the small figures. Tanguy said that it was an image he saw entirely in his imagination before starting to paint it. He also claimed he took the title of this and other works from psychiatric textbooks: "I remember spending a whole afternoon with ... André Breton," he said, "leafing through books on psychiatry in the search for statements of patients which could be used as titles for paintings."  Jennifer Mundy, however, discovered that the title of this painting and several others were taken from a book about paranormal phenomena, Traite de metaphysique (1922) by Dr Charles Richet.

Tanguy's style was an important influence on several younger painters, such as Roberto Matta, Wolfgang Paalen, Toyen, and Esteban Francés, who adopted a Surrealist style in the 1930s. Later, Tanguy's paintings (and, less directly, those of de Chirico) influenced the style of the 1980 French animated movie Le Roi et l'oiseau, by Paul Grimault and Prévert. Tanguy’s works also influenced the science fiction cover art of illustrator Richard Powers.

Partial list of paintings

1920s

Vite! Vite! (1924)
Rue de la Santé (1925) The Museum of Modern Art, New York
Self Portrait (1925) Private Collection
Dancing (1925) Private Collection
The Testament of Jacques Prévert (1925) Private Collection
Fantômas (1925–1926) Private Collection
The Storm (1926)
The Lighthouse (1926) Private Collection, France
The Girl with Red Hair (1926) Private Collection
Title Unknown (The Giantess, The Ladder) (1926) Private Collection
I Came As I Had Promised. Adieu (1926) Dieter Scharf Collection Foundation
The Storm (Black Landscape) (1926) Philadelphia Museum of Art
Woman Dreaming (Sleeping) (1926) Private Collection
Composition (1927) Private Collection
Large Painting Representing a Landscape’’ (1927) Private CollectionDeath Watching His Family (1927) Thyssen-Bornemisza Museum, MadridSecond Message II (Third Message) (1927) Private CollectionSomeone Is Ringing (1927) Private Collection, SwitzerlandThere! (The Evening Before) (1927) Menil Collection, HoustonHe Did What He Wanted (1927) Richard S Zisler Collection, New YorkShadow Country (1927) The Detroit Institute of ArtsMama, Papa is Wounded! (1927) The Museum of Modern Art, New YorkExtinction of Useless Lights (1927) The Museum of Modern Art, New YorkThe Hand in the Clouds (1927) Staatsgalerie StuttgartFinish What I Have Begun (1927) Private CollectionBelomancy I (1927) Museo Nacional Centro de Arte Reina Sofia, MadridSurrealist Landscape (1927) Staatliche Kunsthalle KarlsruheTitle Unknown (Surrealist Composition) (1927) Ulla and Heiner Pietzsch Collection, BerlinTitle Unknown (He Comes) (1928) Private CollectionOld Horizon (1928) National Gallery of Australia, CanberraUnspoken Depths (1928) Private CollectionThe Dark Garden (1928) Kunstsammlung Nordrhein-Westfalen, DüsseldorfTomorrow They Shoot Me (1928) Sara Hildén Art Museum, Tampere, FinlandTabernacle (1928)Landscape with Red Cloud (1928) Private CollectionTitle Unknown (1928) Cleveland Museum of ArtIndifferent Drouning/Indifferent Walnut Tree (1929) Private CollectionPerfect Balance (1929) Gunter Sachs CollectionOutside (1929) Scottish National Gallery of Modern Art, EdinburghLit Bleu (1929) Private CollectionInspiration (1929) Museum of Fine Arts of Rennes, FranceL’Avion (1929)The Look of Amber (1929) The National Gallery of Art, Washington DCThe Lovers (1929) Museum Folkwang, EssenDerive d'Azur (1929) Museum Ludwig, KölnOut of the Blue (1929) Private CollectionThe Lurid Sky (1929) Mount Holyoke College MuseumViews (1929) Private CollectionSatin Pillow (1929) Art Gallery of Ontario, TorontoAt 4 O'Clock in the Summer, Hope (1929) Musée National d'Art Moderne, Paris

1930sCloud (1930) Private CollectionLa Splendeur Semblable (1930)Neither Legends Nor Figures (1930) Menil Collection, HoustonClouds of Earth (The Man) (1930) Private CollectionSimilar Resplendence (1930) Kunstmuseum, BaselTower of the West (1931) Kunstmuseum WinterthurPromontory Palace (1931) Peggy Guggenheim Collection, VeniceThe Armoire of Proteus (1931) Private CollectionFour-Part Screen (The Firmament) (1932) Berardo Collection, LisbonThe Heart of the Tower (1933) Private CollectionThe Certitude of the Never-Seen (1933) The Art Institute of ChicagoBetween the Grass and the Wind (1934) Private CollectionThe End of the Rope (1934) Private CollectionI Am Waiting for You (1934) Los Angeles County Museum of ArtThe Passage of a Smile (1935) The Toledo Museum of ArtÉchelles (1935) Manchester Art GalleryThe Meeting-Place of Parallels (1935) Kunstmuseum, BaselTitle Unknown (Metaphysical Landscape) (1935) Staatsgalerie StuttgartPalming (1935) Private Collection, HamburgThe New Nomads (1935) John and Mable Ringling Museum of Art, SarasotaThe Geometer of Dreams (1935) Private CollectionUntitled (1935) Collection of Carlo F. BilottiHeredity of Acquired Characteristics (1936) Menil Collection, HoustonL’Extinction des Especes (1936)From the Other Side of the Bridge (1936) Private Collection, New YorkThe Nest of the Amphioxus (1936) Museum of GrenobleTreasures of the Sea (1936) Private CollectionFragile (1936)Way of Heredity (1936) Private CollectionThe Air in Her Mirror (1937) Sprengel Museum, HanoverLes Filles des Conséquences (1937)The Doubter (The Interrogation) (1937) Hirshhorn Museum and Sculpture Garden, Washington DCThe Sun in its Jewel Case (1937) Peggy Guggenheim Collection, VeniceLingering Day (1937) Musée National d'Art Moderne, Centre Pompidou, ParisMovements and Acts (1937) Smith College Museum of ArtTitle Unknown (Landscape) (1938) Private CollectionFamiliar Little Person (1938) Musée National d'Art Moderne, Centre Pompidou, ParisEnnui and Tranquility (1938) Private CollectionBoredom and tranquillity (1938) The Jeffrey H. Loria CollectionHidden Thoughts (My Hidden Thoughts) (1939) San Francisco Museum of Modern ArtIf it Were (1939) Private CollectionLa Rue aux Levres (1939)The Furniture of Time (1939) The Museum of Modern Art, New YorkThe Great Nacre Butterfly (1939) Private CollectionSecond Thoughts (1939) San Francisco Museum of Modern ArtSatin Tuning-Fork (1939) Collection of Mr and Mrs Jacques Gelman

1940sThe Satin Tuning Fork (1940) Belomancy II (1940) Private CollectionThe Witness (1940) Collection of Mr and Mrs Frederick R. WeismanA Little Later (1940) Private CollectionThe Earth and the Air (1941) Baltimore Museum of ArtOn Slanting Ground (1941) Peggy Guggenheim Collection, VeniceThe Five Strangers (1941) Wadsworth Atheneum, HartfordTwice The Black (1941) Private CollectionThe Palace of the Windowed Rocks (1942) Musée National d'Art Moderne, Centre Pompidou, ParisNaked Water (1942) Hirshhorn Museum and Sculpture Garden, Washington DCThe Long Rain (1942) Honolulu Museum of ArtIndefinite Divisibility (1942) Albright-Knox Art Gallery, BuffaloThe Absent Lady (1942) Kunstsammlung Nordrhein-Westfalen, DüsseldorfThe Great Mutation (1942) The Museum of Modern Art, New YorkSlowly Toward the North (1942) The Museum of Modern Art, New YorkThe Stone in the Tree (1942) The Arizona State University Art Museum, TempeMinotaur (1943) Fundació Joan Miró, BarcelonaThrough Birds, Through Fire and Not Through Glass (1943) The Minneapolis Institute of ArtsReply to Red (1943) The Minneapolis Institute of ArtsZones D’Instabilite (1943)Equicocal Colors (1943) Private CollectionThe Prodigal Never Returns I (1943) Collection of Mr and Mrs Leonard YaseenThe Prodigal Never Returns II (1943) Collection of Mr and Mrs Leonard YaseenThe Prodigal Never Returns III (1943) Collection of Mr and Mrs Leonard YaseenThe Prodigal Never Returns IV (1943) Collection of Mr and Mrs Leonard YaseenDistances (1944) Private CollectionTwice (1944) Private CollectionThe Tower of the Sea (1944) Washington University Gallery of Art, St LouisMy Life, White and Black (1944) Collection of Mr and Mrs Jacques GelmanThe Rapidity of Sleep (1945) The Art Institute of Chicago, ChicagoThere, Motion Has Not Yet Ceased (1945) Richard S Zeisler Collection, Guggenheim, New YorkThere the Mouth has not Ceased Yet (1945) Collection of Richard S. ZeislerThe Provider (1945) Private CollectioHands and Gloves (1946) Musée d'Art Moderne de Saint-EtienneClothed in Wakefulness (1947) Collection of Mr and Mrs Isidore M. CohenThere Is (1947) Private CollectionAt the Risk of the Sun (1947) Nelson Gallery - Atkins Museum, Kansas CityFrom One Night to Another (1947) de Young Museum, San FranciscoFirst Stone (1947) Private CollectionWho Will Answer (1948) Collection of Mr and Mrs Herbert LustFear (1949) Whitney Museum of American Art, New York

1950sRose of the Four Winds (1950) Wadsworth Atheneum, HartfordThe Immense Window (1950) Private CollectionFrom Pale Hands to Weary Skies (1950) Yale University Art GalleryTo look at in Winter (1950) Smith College Museum of ArtUnlimited Sequences (1951) Pennsylvania Academy of Fine Arts, PhiladelphiaThe Invisibles / The Transparent Ones (1951) Tate Modern, LondonThe Hunted Sky (1951) Menil Collection, HoustonTime Without Change (1951) University of Arizona Museum of Art, TucsonThe Stars in Open-Work (1951) The Art Institute of ChicagoBecause (1951) Williams College Museum of ArtThis Morning (1951) Collection of Nesuhi ErtegunThrough the Forest (1952)The Mirage of Time (1954) The Metropolitan Museum of Art, New YorkThe Saltimbanques (1954) Richard L Feigen, New YorkImaginary Numbers (1954) Thyssen-Bornemisza Museum, MadridFrom Green to White (1954) Collection of Mr and Mrs Jacques GelmanMultiplication of the Arcs (1954) The Museum of Modern Art, New York

References

Bibliography

Acquavella, Nicholas M. and John Ashbery. 1974. Yves Tanguy. Acquavella Galleries, Inc. New York. unpaginated. 
Anonymous. 2001. An Important Private Collection of Works by Yves Tanguy, May 10, 2001. Christie's New York. 72 pp.
Berggruen, Olivier. 2002. Yves Tanguy, Peintre De L’Illusion Métaphysique in Yves Tanguy, Malingue (2002), pp. 9–13.
Breton, André. 1942. What Tanguy Veils and Reveals. View 2(2): 4–7 pp.
Le Bihan, Rene, Mabin Renée & Sawin Martica. 2001. Yves Tanguy (French). Editions Palantines.  / 
Le Bihan, René, Olivier Berggruen, and Jean-Jacques Lebel. 2002. Yves Tanguy (French). Galerie Malingue, Paris. 108 pp. 
Marchesseau, Daniel. 1973. Yves Tanguy (French). Éditions Filipacchi, Paris, 68 pp. [German Ed. 1974. Rembrandt-Verlag, Berlin] 
Maur, Karin von. 2001. Yves Tanguy and Surrealism. Hatie Cantz Publications. Ostfildern-Ruit, Germany. 252 pp.  [with essays by *Susan Davidson, Konrad Klapheck, Gordon Onslow Ford, Andreas Schalhorn, and Beate Wolf]. 
Miller, Stephen Robeson and Jonathan Stuhlman. 2011. Double Solitaire: The Surreal Worlds of Kay Sage and Yves Tanguy. The Katonah Museum of Art and the Mint Museum with the Pierre Matisse Foundation, New York. 104 pp. 

Soby, James Thrall. 1955. Yves Tanguy. Museum of Modern Art. New York, N. Y. 72 pp..
Wittrock, Wolfgang and Stanley W. Hayter. 1976. Yves Tanguy: The Graphic Work'' (German). Wittrock Kunsthandel, Düsseldorf. 62 pp.

External links
 DoddsNet Yves Tanguy Archive
 List of Tanguy Exhibitions
 Yves Tanguy at the WebMuseum
 Tate Collection Page
 MoMA Collection Page

20th-century French painters
20th-century French male artists
French male painters
French emigrants to the United States
20th-century American painters
American male painters
Modern painters
French surrealist artists
1900 births
1955 deaths
French people of Breton descent
People from Finistère
Lycée Saint-Louis alumni
Painters from Paris
People from Woodbury, Connecticut
20th-century American male artists